John Guzik may refer to:

 John Guzik (linebacker) (1936–2012), American football player
 John Guzik (defensive lineman) (born 1962), American football player